FZ:OZ (pronounced "eff-zee oh-zee"; in imitation of "Aussie") is a live album by Frank Zappa, released in 2002 as a two-CD set and is the first release on the Vaulternative Records label from the Zappa Family Trust. It contains almost all of the January 20, 1976 concert at the Hordern Pavilion in Sydney, Australia.

Overview
Only one reel-to-reel tape machine was available to record the concert, resulting in gaps in some songs as the tape needed to be changed. However, these gaps have been filled in with bootleg recordings from the same tour. As a result, there is a drop in sound quality during these sections, but the concert is preserved almost in its entirety.

Much of the featured material had not been released at the time of the recording, including "Canard Toujours", which later became "Kreega Bondola", then later changed to "Let's Move to Cleveland", which was included on Does Humor Belong in Music? (1986), and several tracks that would later appear on Zoot Allures (1976). One song, "Kaiser Rolls", appears for the first time on FZ:OZ, and in two versions—the recording from the concert, which has had a missing section edited in, and a rehearsal version recorded before the start of the tour which is included at the end of disc two, entitled "Kaiser Rolls (Du Jour)". The lengthy guitar solo on "Zoot Allures" contains a section with extensive use of a "VCF" (voltage-controlled filter). This part was subsequently entitled "Ship Ahoy" when Zappa released its counterpart from Osaka (February 3, 1976) on Shut Up 'n Play Yer Guitar in 1981. However, it wasn't separated into its own track on FZ:OZ.

Track listing
All tracks written, composed and arranged by Frank Zappa.

"Zoot Allures" includes the "VCF" section known elsewhere as "Ship Ahoy".

Personnel 
 Frank Zappa – guitar, vocals
 Napoleon Murphy Brock – tenor saxophone, vocals
 Andre Lewis – keyboards, vocals
 Roy Estrada – bass guitar, vocals
 Terry Bozzio – drums, vocals
Guest:
 Norman Gunston – harmonica on "The Torture Never Stops"

References

External links
Lyrics and details
Release history

Live albums published posthumously
Frank Zappa live albums
2002 live albums